Dennis S. Fitzgerald  (1865-1936) was an English born Major League Baseball infielder.

External links

Major League Baseball shortstops
Major League Baseball players from the United Kingdom
Major League Baseball players from England
English baseball players
Philadelphia Athletics (AA) players
1865 births
1936 deaths
Guelph Maple Leafs players
Oswego Sweegs players
Boston Blues players
Lawrence (minor league baseball) players
Salem (minor league baseball) players
Portland (minor league baseball) players
Binghamton Crickets (1880s) players
London Tecumsehs (baseball) players
Elmira (minor league baseball) players
Jackson Jaxons players
Lima Lushers players
New Haven (minor league baseball) players
Rochester Flour Cities players
Omaha Omahogs players
19th-century baseball players